The Metropolitan Police Act 1864 (27 & 28 Vict. c. 55) was one of a series of Metropolitan Police Acts. It was wholly repealed by the Statute Law (Repeals) Act 1989.

Provisions
The provisions of the Act include:
Repealing Section 57 of the Metropolitan Police Act 1839 and replacing it with a section allowing street musicians to be fined no more than forty shillings or to be imprisoned for no more than three days.

Sources

United Kingdom Acts of Parliament 1864
Police legislation in the United Kingdom